Berzeliusskolan (most often called Berzan) is a primary and secondary school (secondary above all), in Linköping, Sweden. The school is run by Linköping Municipality.

Berzeliusskolan was founded as a primary school in 1953 under the name of Vasaskolan. When the school also enjoyed a visit from King Gustaf VI Adolf. Vasaskolan was shut down in 1965 and reopened two years later as an institution of higher learning (high school/secondary school). Since 1997 Berzeliusskolan once again holds classes for 1,500 students in grade 7–9 in addition to the students in secondary school.

The school is named after Jöns Jacob Berzelius, one of the fathers of modern chemistry. Berzelius was, perhaps ironically, a student at Berzeliusskolan's neighbour and rival, Katedralskolan. Katedralskolan was the only secondary school in Linköping at that time.

Programs 
Berzeliusskolan offers programs in Natural Sciences and Technology for its secondary school students. Having great focus on math skills and holding the university math preparation class Matte F.

The primary school also offers specialisation classes in Natural Sciences and Technology.

External links 
Berzeliusskolan Website

Educational institutions established in 1953
Buildings and structures in Linköping
Gymnasiums (school) in Sweden
1953 establishments in Sweden